Salim ibn Sawadah al-Tamimi was a governor of Egypt for the Abbasid Caliphate, from 780 to 781.

He was appointed by the caliph al-Mahdi in late 780 with jurisdiction over military affairs, while a separate official was selected to handle matters of taxation. The historian Ibn Taghribirdi mentions that during his governorship both Egypt and the Maghreb suffered from a series of violent conflicts, and that Egyptian troops were briefly sent to assist Barqa but were later withdrawn without engaging in any fighting. He remained as governor until mid-781, when he was dismissed and replaced with Ibrahim ibn Salih.

Notes

References
 
 

8th-century Abbasid governors of Egypt
Abbasid governors of Egypt
8th-century Arabs